is a railway station in the city of Fukushima, Fukushima Prefecture, Japan operated by Fukushima Kōtsū.

Lines
Hanamizuzaka Station is served by the Iizaka Line and is located 8.7 km from the starting point of the line at

Station layout
Hanamizuzaka Station has one side platform serving a single bi-directional track. The station is unattended. There is a single machine that dispenses proof-of-departure tickets, a beverage vending machine, a waiting room, and a public telephone. There is also a bicycle parking area situated next to the station.

Adjacent stations

History
The station commenced operations on April 13, 1924. On March 23, 1927, the station was renamed to its present-day name of Hanamizuzaka. In 2007 the waiting room and security cameras were added.

Surrounding area

See also
 List of railway stations in Japan

External links

  

Railway stations in Japan opened in 1924
Railway stations in Fukushima Prefecture
Fukushima Kōtsū Iizaka Line
Fukushima (city)